Maria Pallotta-Chiarolli  is an Australian academic, author and activist specializing in the study of gender, sexuality and intersectionality. Pallotta-Chiarolli is an Honorary Fellow at Deakin University, and a member of its Gender and Sexuality Studies Network and LGBTIQ+ Network, researching in gender diversity, cultural diversity, family diversity and sexual diversity. She is also the author of  Australia's first AIDS biography.

Awards and recognition 

 Two Lambda Literary Awards (GLBTIQ) and 2 Bisexual Book Awards in the USA.
 Founding member of the Australian LGBTIQ+ Multicultural Council in 2004.
2001 Australian Book Design Award in the Educational Texts for Young People Category for Boys Stuff, and listed in the Australian Centre for Youth Literature's “150 Years,150 Books: Victoria’s Most Treasured Books” list.
 2018, Victorian Globe Straight Ally Award.
 2021, the national annual Maria Pallotta-Chiarolli Writers' Fellowship was established in the WA Writers Centre.
 2022 Australia Day Honours appointed a Member of the Order of Australia for "significant service to the LGBTIQ community, and to education".

Books 

 Someone You Know: A Friend's Farewell, Adelaide: Wakefield Press, 1991. (new edition, 2002)
 Girls Talk: Young Women Speak Their Hearts and Minds, Lane Cove, Sydney: Finch Publishing, 1998.
 Tapestry: Italian Lives Over Five Generations, Milson's Point, Sydney: Random House, 1999.
 Boys’ Stuff: Boys Talking About What Matters, co-edited with Wayne Martino Sydney: Allen & Unwin, 2001.
 So What's A Boy? : Addressing Issues of Masculinity in Education with co-author Wayne Martino, London: Open University Press, 2003
 When Our Children Come Out: how to support gay, lesbian, bisexual and transgendered young people Sydney: Finch Publishing, 2005.
 "Being Normal is the Only Thing To Be": Adolescents Perspectives on Gender at School, co-written with Wayne Martino, University of New South Wales Press,  2005.
 Love You Two, Sydney: Random House, 2008.
 Border Sexualities, Border Families in Schools,  New York: Rowman & Littlefield, 2010.
 The Politics of Recognition and Social Justice: Transforming Subjectivities and New Forms of Resistance co-edited with Bob Pease, Routledge, 2014.
 Queerying Families of Origin co-edited with Chiara Bertone; Taylor & Francis Books, Oxfordshire, 2015
 Bisexuality in Education: Erasure, Exclusion by Inclusion, and the Absence of Intersectionality; (edited) London: Routledge, 2015
 Women in Relationships with Bisexual Men: Bi Men By Women. New York: Lexington Books, 2016.
 Living and Loving in Diversity: An Anthology of Australian Multicultural Queer Adventures. Adelaide: Wakefield Press, 2018.

References

External links 
 

Living people
Year of birth missing (living people)
Members of the Order of Australia
Academic staff of Deakin University
Australian writers